Calcium fumarate is a compound with formula Ca(C2H2(COO)2) or (OOC-CH=CH-COO)Ca. It is a calcium salt of fumaric acid, and has been used to enrich foods to boost calcium absorption.

It has E number "E367".

References

Fumarates
Calcium compounds